Acompsia minorella is a moth of the family Gelechiidae. It is found in Austria, the Czech Republic, France, Italy, Slovenia and Switzerland. The habitat consists of warm forest steppes.

The wingspan is about 15 mm for males and females. The forewings are greyish brown, overlaid with yellow grey or light brown scales. The hindwings are dark grey. Adults are on wing from May to June and again from July to September, probably in two generations per year.

References

Moths described in 1899
Acompsia
Moths of Europe